Xanthocrambus delicatellus is a species of moth in the family Crambidae. It is found in Portugal, Spain, France and on Sardinia and Sicily.

The wingspan is about 21 mm.

References

Moths described in 1863
Crambinae
Moths of Europe